Canadian soccer club CF Montréal (known as the Montreal Impact until 2020) has competed in Major League Soccer since 2012. Prior to becoming an MLS club, Montreal competed in a variety of second-division American leagues from their foundation in 1992. The following list summarizes the results for both the predecessor and successor clubs, with totals including statistics from both iterations of the Impact.

Key
Key to competitions

 Major League Soccer (MLS) – The top-flight of soccer in the United States, established in 1996.
 North American Soccer League (NASL) – The second division of soccer in the United States from 2011 through 2017, now defunct.
 USSF Division 2 Professional League (D2 Pro) – The second division of soccer in the United States for a single season in 2010, now defunct.
 USL First Division (USL-1) – The second division of soccer in the United States from 2005 through 2009.
 A-League – The second division of soccer in the United States from 1995 through 2004, now defunct.
 American Professional Soccer League (APSL) – The second division of soccer in the United States from 1990 through 1996, now defunct.
 Canadian Championship (CC) – The premier knockout cup competition in Canadian soccer, first contested in 2008. The Voyageurs Cup (VC), founded in 2002, preceded the competition and now serves as the championship trophy for the current cup tournament.
 CONCACAF Champions League (CCL) – The premier competition in North American soccer since 1962. It went by the name of Champions' Cup until 2008.

Key to colours and symbols

Key to league record
 Season = The year and article of the season
 Div = Division/level on pyramid
 League = League name
 Pld = Games played
 W = Games won
 L = Games lost
 D = Games drawn
 GF = Goals for
 GA = Goals against
 GD = Goal difference
 Pts = Points
 PPG = Points per game
 Conf. = Conference position
 Overall = League position

Key to cup record
 DNE = Did not enter
 DNQ = Did not qualify
 NH = Competition not held or cancelled
 QR = Qualifying round
 PR = Preliminary round
 GS = Group stage
 R1 = First round
 R2 = Second round
 R3 = Third round
 R4 = Fourth round
 R5 = Fifth round
 Ro16 = Round of 16
 QF = Quarter-finals
 SF = Semi-finals
 F = Final
 RU = Runners-up
 W = Winners

Seasons

1. Avg. attendance include statistics from league matches only.
2. Top goalscorer(s) includes all goals scored in League, Playoffs, Canadian Championship, MLS is Back Tournament, CONCACAF Champions League, FIFA Club World Cup, and other competitive continental matches.
3. Points and PPG have been adjusted from non-traditional to traditional scoring systems for seasons prior to 2003 to more effectively compare historical team performance across seasons.

References

External links

 
Montreal Impact